Margaux Louise Hemingway (born Margot Louise Hemingway; February 16, 1954 – July 1, 1996) was an American fashion model and actress. She gained success as a supermodel in the mid-1970s, appearing on the covers of magazines including Cosmopolitan, Elle, Harper's Bazaar, Vogue, and Time.

She signed a million-dollar contract with Fabergé Inc. as the spokesmodel for Babe perfume. She was the granddaughter of writer Ernest Hemingway. Her later years were marred by highly publicized episodes of addiction and depression, before her suicide from a drug overdose on July 1, 1996, at the age of 42.

Early life 
Margot Louise Hemingway was born February 16, 1954, in Portland, Oregon, the second of three daughters born to Byra Louise (née Whittlesey) and Jack Hemingway (eldest son of writer Ernest Hemingway). When she learned that she was named after the wine, Château Margaux, which her parents drank on the night she was conceived, she changed the spelling from "Margot" to "Margaux" to match. She had two sisters, actress Mariel Hemingway, and Joan (nicknamed Muffet).

During her childhood, the family relocated from Oregon to Cuba, where her grandfather had lived, then to San Francisco, and later to Idaho, where they lived on her grandfather's farm in Ketchum, adjacent to   The family took trips each summer back to Oregon with the daughters' godmother, who owned a farm in Salem. She attended the Catlin Gabel School in Portland for her junior year.

Margaux struggled with a variety of disorders beginning in her teenage years, including alcoholism, depression, bulimia, and epilepsy. With her permission, a video recording was made of her therapy session related to her bulimia, and it was broadcast on television. She also had dyslexia. In the 1990s, Margaux reported that she had been sexually abused by her father as a child. In 2013, her younger sister Mariel said in the documentary Running from Crazy that both Margaux and their older sister Muffet had been sexually abused by their father.

Career

1972–1975: modeling
This was the first million-dollar contract ever awarded to a fashion model. She also appeared on the covers of Cosmopolitan, Elle, Harper's Bazaar, and Vogue, as well as on the June 16, 1975, cover of TIME, which dubbed her one of the "new beauties". The September 1, 1975, cover issue of Vogue called Hemingway "New York's New Supermodel".

In a 1997 E! True Hollywood Story that profiled Hemingway's life, her mentor and close friend Zachary Selig discussed how he helped launch her early career with his initial marketing and public relations work as she became a global celebrity, and he introduced her to yoga and the Solar Kundalini "Codex Relaxatia" paradigm as tools for success and to overcome some of her debilitating mental disorders. Selig and Hemingway spent time with the Hemingway family at their property in Ketchum adjacent to Sun Valley, where they studied Solar Kundalini, yoga, and meditation together. Hemingway continued using these relaxation skills for the rest of her life.

During the height of her modeling career in the mid- to late 1970s, Hemingway was a regular attendee of New York City's exclusive discothèque Studio 54, often in the company of such celebrities as Halston, Bianca Jagger, Liza Minnelli, Grace Jones, and Andy Warhol. At such social mixers, she began to use alcohol and drugs.

1976–1996: film career

Hemingway made her film debut in the Lamont Johnson-directed rape and revenge film Lipstick (1976), alongside her 14-year-old sister Mariel, and Anne Bancroft. In it, she plays a fashion model who is terrorized by a rapist. The film's violent depiction of rape led it to be labeled an exploitation film, though in later years it had success as a cult film.

She followed this with a supporting role in the Italian horror film Killer Fish (1979), opposite Lee Majors and Karen Black. Her following project was the comedy They Call Me Bruce? in 1982. In 1984, Hemingway had a supporting part in Over the Brooklyn Bridge, opposite Elliott Gould and Shelley Winters. In 1987, she checked into the Betty Ford Center.

Attempting to make a comeback, she appeared on the cover of Playboy in May 1990, and asked the magazine to hire Selig as the creative director for her cover story. It was shot in Belize. Despite her attempts, Hemingway's budding film career began to falter, and she took roles in several B-movies, including Killing Machine (1984) and Inner Sanctum (1991).

Hemingway continued to support herself by appearing in a small number of direct-to-video films into the 1990s, autographing her nude photos from Playboy, and endorsing a psychic telephone hotline owned by her cousin, Adiel Hemingway. Shortly before her death, she was set to host the outdoor adventure series Wild Guide on the Discovery Channel.

Personal life

Hemingway's first marriage, to Errol Wetson (Wetanson), ended in divorce. They met when, at age 19, she accompanied her father to the Plaza Hotel in New York City on a business trip. Four months later she moved from Idaho to New York City to live with Wetson as a guest at Selig's apartment at 12 East 72nd Street, which was owned by heiress Gloria Vanderbilt.

It was there that Selig made Hemingway's business and social introductions to his friends, such as Marian McEvoy, fashion editor at Women's Wear Daily; photographer Francesco Scavullo; fashion designer Halston; Vogue fashion editor Francis Stein; and Jon Revson, Selig's cousin. Revson, a scion of the Revson family that created Revlon cosmetics, declined Selig's offer for Hemingway to endorse Revlon, whereas later Fabergé signed her on with the largest salary of its day. Revson did come to visit both Selig and Hemingway (with the Hemingway family) in Ketchum to congratulate her after Hemingway's TIME magazine cover appeared in June 1975.

Marian McEvoy quickly interviewed Margaux at a party given by Selig, which resulted in Hemingway's Women's Wear Daily front- and back-page story that launched Hemingway into the fashion limelight.

She divorced him in 1985 after 

Hemingway had strained relationships with members of her family. She had a tense relationship with her mother, though they reconciled prior to Byra's death from cancer in 1988. She also competed with her younger sister Mariel, who received greater accolades for her acting. In the 1990s, Hemingway alleged that her father, Jack, had molested her as a child. Her father and stepmother, Angela, resented the allegations and stopped speaking to her. Angela told People magazine, "Jack and I did not talk to her for two years. She constantly lies. The whole family won't have anything to do with her. She's nothing but an angry woman."

A 2013 television documentary film Running from Crazy, in which Margaux's sister Mariel speaks of the Hemingway family history of alcoholism, drug addiction, molestation, and suicide, contains clips filmed by Margaux before her death.

Death
On July 1, 1996, Hemingway was found dead in her studio apartment in Santa Monica. Though her body was found reportedly badly decomposed, the official autopsy and California death records list July 1 as her date of death. She had taken an overdose of phenobarbital, according to the Los Angeles County coroner's toxicology report one month later, although her family had difficulty accepting the fact of her suicide.

Hemingway was interred at the Hemingway family plot at Ketchum Cemetery in Ketchum, Idaho.

Mariel Hemingway's husband told People in 1996 that, "This [year] was the best I'd seen [Margaux] in years. She had gotten herself back together", but in a December 2005 episode of Larry King Live, Mariel said she now accepted her sister's death as a suicide.

Filmography

Notes

References

External links 

 

1954 births
1996 deaths
1996 suicides
Hemingway family
Actresses from Portland, Oregon
American film actresses
American female models
Female models from Idaho
Actresses from Idaho
20th-century American actresses
Burials in Idaho
Drug-related suicides in California
Barbiturates-related deaths
Female models from Oregon
People with epilepsy
Catlin Gabel School alumni
Female suicides